Hartley C. Saunders (7 November 1943 – 9 June 2004) was a Bahamian athlete. He competed in the men's triple jump at the 1964 Summer Olympics.

References

1943 births
2004 deaths
Athletes (track and field) at the 1964 Summer Olympics
Athletes (track and field) at the 1966 British Empire and Commonwealth Games
Bahamian male triple jumpers
Olympic athletes of the Bahamas
Place of birth missing
Commonwealth Games competitors for the Bahamas